Japan does not recognize same-sex marriages or civil unions. It is the only country in the G7 that does not legally recognize same-sex unions in any form. Several municipalities and prefectures issue symbolic same-sex partnership certificates, which provide some benefits but do not offer any legal recognition. Most polls conducted since 2013 have found that a majority of Japanese people support the legalization of same-sex marriage or partnerships, and a 2018 poll found it supported by an overwhelming majority of those under age 60.

On 20 June 2022, a district court in Osaka upheld the constitutionality of the same-sex marriage ban. Previously, on 17 March 2021, a district court in Sapporo had ruled it unconstitutional, arguing that laws or regulations that deprive same-sex couples of the legal benefits of marriage constitute "discriminatory treatment without a rational basis" and as such violate Article 14 of the Constitution of Japan. The Sapporo court also ruled that Article 24 of the Constitution, which defines marriage as "based only on the mutual consent of both sexes", does not prohibit the recognition of same-sex marriages. While the Sapporo ruling did not legalise same-sex marriage in Japan, it was anticipated that it might have pressured the National Diet to act.

Partnership certification system

As of 15 March 2023, 258 municipalities and twelve prefectures have established a "partnership oath system", also known as "partnership certification system", which provides same-sex couples with some limited benefits. The couple is issued a special certificate which may be useful in matters such as housing, hospital visitation rights and consenting to surgery for a partner. However, the system is not legally binding and there is no legal obligation on landlords or hospitals to honour the couples' rights even if presented with a certificate, though cities have encouraged companies, hospitals and landlords to recognize the certificate. The various benefits provided by the system are also very limited in comparison to those granted to married couples; same-sex couples cannot inherit the estate and property of a deceased partner or attend the funeral of a deceased partner for instance. Partners must meet certain requirements, including living in the municipality or prefecture, being older than 20 years of age, and not having a spouse or another partner. 36 municipalities have also established a "partnership family system". This system also recognises the children of same-sex couples, and allows partners to make medical decisions for their child, and to pick up their children at schools and kindergartens (whereas previously only the biological parent was allowed to pick up the child). The first to establish this system was Akashi, Hyōgo in January 2021 followed by Tokushima in February 2021 and Adachi, Tokyo in April 2021. Tokyo established a partnership system with a similar option in November 2022, becoming the first prefectural government to do so.

Municipal partnership systems 
On April 1, 2015, Shibuya in central Tokyo announced it would offer same-sex couples special "partnership certificates". While these licenses are not legally recognized as marriage certificates, they may be used in civil matters such as hospital visitation rights and housing. The Shibuya city office began accepting applications on 28 October 2015. In response to this action by the Shibuya city office, the "Special Committee to Protect Family Ties" of the federal ruling Liberal Democratic Party was formed in March 2015 to discuss the matter. An officer from the Ministry of Justice who was invited to comment stated that the action by Shibuya is legal because the certificate issued is not a marriage certificate and the current Japanese legal code does not prohibit the "partnership" of same-sex couples. In July 2015, Setagaya announced it would be joining Shibuya in issuing partnership certificates from 5 November. In November 2015, the special city of Takarazuka announced it would issue partnership certificates to same-sex couples beginning on 1 June 2016. In December 2015, the city of Iga in Mie Prefecture made a similar announcement, with certificates starting on 1 April 2016, and on 22 February 2016, Naha, the capital of Okinawa Prefecture, announced it would begin issuing partnership certificates to same-sex couples on 8 July 2016.

In April 2016, an LGBT rights group began a campaign for the official recognition of same-sex couples in Sapporo, the capital of Hokkaido Prefecture. The group took its petition to the Sapporo City Government in June 2016. In December 2016, officials announced that Sapporo planned to draw up guidelines by March 2017. In March, the City Government announced that partnership certificates would be issued to couples beginning on 1 June 2017. While the certificates hold no legal meaning, some insurance companies use them to allow same-sex partners to be added as beneficiaries. According to the city, about 1,500 people expressed opinions welcoming the program, while some opposed it. Sapporo became the first designated city in Japan to establish a partnership system. On 14 February 2018, the Fukuoka city office announced plans to start issuing partnership certificates to same-sex and different-sex couples from 2 April 2018. Osaka followed suit on 9 July 2018, and Chiba on 29 January 2019. Nakano began offering partnership certificates on 20 August 2018. Couples can receive notarized documentation recognizing a delegation agreement for medical treatment and nursing care, property management and other areas in which married couples share responsibility.

The number of cities which have established a partnership registry has steadily increased in the years since. 21 cities established a same-sex partnership system in 2019, notably Kitakyushu, Kumamoto, Miyazaki, Nagasaki, Sakai, Yokohama, and Yokosuka. 36 more cities followed suit in 2020, including Hamamatsu, Kawasaki, Kyoto, Minato, Nara, Niigata, Okayama, Sagamihara, Saitama, and Takamatsu. 69 more cities followed in 2021, notably Adachi, Chigasaki, Fujisawa, Funabashi, Hiroshima, Kanazawa, Kōchi, Koshigaya, Nishinomiya, and Toyota. 107 cities established a partnership system in 2022, including Akita, Kagoshima, Nagano, and Shizuoka.

Prefectural partnership systems 

In January 2019, the Government of Ibaraki Prefecture announced it was considering introducing a partnership system for same-sex couples in April 2019. In March 2019, Governor Kazuhiko Ōigawa expressed his personal support for the introduction of such a scheme. The Ibaraki Prefectural Assembly began examing legislation to this effect in June 2019. The prefecture has offered partnership certificates since July 1, 2019, which made it the first prefecture to do so. Eight days later, Mito, the prefectural capital, announced that couples who are in the possession of the prefecture's certificates would be eligible to move into the municipality's public housing facilities, starting in August 2019.

On 15 January 2020, Osaka Prefecture announced it would start a partnership system on January 22. Governor Hirofumi Yoshimura said in a statement that "we should aim for a society where one can live as themselves". The first couple to receive a certificate were Shuji Yamada and Shigeo Hiruda on 31 January. The certificate allows couples to apply to move into prefectural housing and consent to surgery, among other limited benefits. Five cities in Osaka had already established such a system before it was extended to the entire prefecture. Gunma Prefecture announced on 5 November 2020 that it would introduce a partnership system by the end of the year. The system would provide same-sex couples with some limited recognition, including the right to move into prefectural housing and visit each other in hospitals. Governor Ichita Yamamoto said he hoped the move would "send a positive message" and "promote diversity". On 17 December, Yamamoto announced the system would be established on 21 December. The first certificate was issued to couple Saori Tanaka and Hisanagi Makita in Shibukawa on 24 December.

On 20 November 2020, Governor Eikei Suzuki of Mie Prefecture announced his intention to introduce a partnership system before the end of the year. The system was introduced on 1 September 2021, with the first couple issued a certificate that same day in Tsu. Saga Prefecture started its partnership oath system a few days earlier, on 27 August 2021. Governor Yoshinori Yamaguchi praised the move. In November 2021, the government of Aomori Prefecture announced its intention to introduce a partnership system on 7 February 2022. A partnership oath system has also been in effect in Akita and Fukuoka prefectures since 1 April 2022. On 15 February 2022, Governor Tomikazu Fukuda of Tochigi Prefecture announced he would introduce a partnership system in fall 2022; it was established on 1 September 2022.

On 7 June 2021, the General Affairs Committee of the Tokyo Metropolitan Assembly unanimously accepted a petition, launched by LGBT activists and signed by 18,000 people, to establish a partnership system in Tokyo Metropolis. Governor Yuriko Koike expressed her support for the move, stating it would "respect the human rights of sexual minorities and promote the understanding of Tokyo citizens regarding diversity". The bill was enacted by the Metropolitan Assembly on 15 June 2022. It calls on businesses and other entities to treat same-sex partnerships as equal to married couples, allowing couples to access family-use housing and the right to visit their partners in hospital. At least one partner must be resident in Tokyo or a commuter for work. It came into force on 1 November, with applications being accepted from 10 October, making Tokyo the tenth prefecture to do so.

Governor Hajime Furuta of Gifu Prefecture announced on 10 December 2020 that he was considering establishing a partnership system in the prefecture. Governor Heita Kawakatsu of Shizuoka Prefecture announced on 1 September 2021 that he was also considering it by the end of 2022. The Deputy Governor of Toyama Prefecture voiced the same in December 2021. Both Shizuoka and Toyama prefectures established a partnership system on 1 March 2023.

The establishment of prefectural systems has often not precluded the subsequent establishments of municipal systems within the same prefecture.

Mutual recognition of certificates

Between cities 
On October 30, 2019, the cities of Fukuoka and Kumamoto announced they would recognize each other's partnership certificates effective immediately. This marked the first time that two or more jurisdictions in Japan had begun recognizing each other's certificates, easing recognition for same-sex couples. This means that if a same-sex couple with a certificate moves between both cities they need not reapply for a certificate in their new city. Since 1 April 2020, certificates from Kitakyushu and Koga are also recognized between the four cities. Certificates from Okayama, Nichinan, and Karatsu are also recognised in Fukuoka.

On December 2, 2019, the mayor of Yokosuka announced his intention to establish a joint recognition scheme with the fellow Kanagawa cities of Zushi and Kamakura, taking effect on 1 April 2020. Hayama joined the scheme on 1 July 2020, and Miura joined on 1 January 2021. In July 2020, Okayama and Sōja agreed to mutually recognize their certificates and eliminate the need for new procedures when couples move between the two cities. Okayama reached a similar agreement with Fukuoka in November 2020 and Hiroshima in January 2021. Hiroshima and Akitakata also mutually recognize their certificates. The cities of Katano and Hirakata decided to recognize each other's certificates in June 2021. Since then, numerous other cities have also established such mutual recognition schemes. On 1 February 2022, a similar agreement took effect between Chigasaki, Fujisawa and Samukawa.

The cities of Chiba and Yokohama made a similar recognition agreement in January 2021, effective on 1 February 2021. In early April 2021, the cities and towns of Amagasaki, Ashiya, Inagawa, Itami, Kawanishi, Nishinomiya, Sanda and Takarazuka, all in Hyōgo Prefecture, agreed to recognize each other's certificates. Likewise, in May 2021, 12 municipalities in Tokyo, Adachi, Bunkyō, Edogawa, Fuchū, Koganei, Kokubunji, Kunitachi, Minato, Nakano, Setagaya, Shibuya and Toshima, agreed to mutually recognize their certificates. Upon establishing its own partnership registry in November 2022, Tokyo Metropolis recognized all partnerships previously registered in Tokyo's wards and cities.

Between prefectures 
On 18 August 2022, Saga and Ibaraki prefectures announced they would recognize each other's partnership certificates, becoming the first prefectures to do so. Saga Prefecture completed a similar agreement with Fukuoka on 24 November. On 20 December, mutual recognition was established between Ibaraki, Tochigi and Gunma prefectures. On 31 January 2023, Ibaraki signed an agreement with Mie.

List
As of 15 March 2023, the following 258 municipalities and twelve prefectures have established a partnership oath system, comprising about 69% of the Japanese population.  In 38 further jurisdictions, such policies will soon take effect.

Prefectures
  Ibaraki (1 July 2019)
  Osaka (22 January 2020)
  Gunma (21 December 2020)
  Saga (27 August 2021)
  Mie (1 September 2021)
  Aomori (7 February 2022)
  Akita (1 April 2022)
  Fukuoka (1 April 2022)
  Tochigi (1 September 2022)
  Tokyo (1 November 2022)
  Shizuoka (1 March 2023)
  Toyama (1 March 2023)

Municipalities

  Shibuya, Tokyo (28 October 2015)
  Setagaya, Tokyo (5 November 2015)
  Iga, Mie (1 April 2016)
  Takarazuka, Hyōgo (1 June 2016)
  Naha, Okinawa (8 July 2016)
  Sapporo, Hokkaido (1 June 2017)
  Fukuoka, Fukuoka (2 April 2018)
  Osaka, Osaka (9 July 2018)
  Nakano, Tokyo (20 August 2018)
  Ōizumi, Gunma (1 January 2019)
  Chiba, Chiba (29 January 2019)
  Edogawa, Tokyo (1 April 2019)
  Fuchū, Tokyo (1 April 2019)
  Hirakata, Osaka (1 April 2019)
  Kumamoto, Kumamoto (1 April 2019)
  Odawara, Kanagawa (1 April 2019)
  Sakai, Osaka (1 April 2019)
  Sōja, Okayama (1 April 2019)
  Toshima, Tokyo (1 April 2019)
  Yokosuka, Kanagawa (1 April 2019)
  Kanuma, Tochigi (3 June 2019)
  Miyazaki, Miyazaki (10 June 2019)
  Kitakyushu, Fukuoka (1 July 2019)
  Nishio, Aichi (1 September 2019)
  Nagasaki, Nagasaki (2 September 2019)
  Sanda, Hyōgo (11 October 2019)
  Katano, Osaka (22 November 2019)
  Yokohama, Kanagawa (2 December 2019)
  Daitō, Osaka (4 December 2019)
  Kamakura, Kanagawa (4 December 2019)
  Mitoyo, Kagawa (1 January 2020)
  Amagasaki, Hyōgo (6 January 2020)
  Bunkyō, Tokyo (1 April 2020)
  Hamamatsu, Shizuoka (1 April 2020)
  Kijō, Miyazaki (1 April 2020)
  Koga, Fukuoka (1 April 2020)
  Minato, Tokyo (1 April 2020)
  Nara, Nara (1 April 2020)
  Niigata, Niigata (1 April 2020)
  Sagamihara, Kanagawa (1 April 2020)
  Saitama, Saitama (1 April 2020)
  Takamatsu, Kagawa (1 April 2020)
  Tokushima, Tokushima (1 April 2020)
  Yamatokōriyama, Nara (1 April 2020)
  Zushi, Kanagawa (1 April 2020)
  Kawagoe, Saitama (1 May 2020)
  Toyoake, Aichi (1 May 2020)
  Itami, Hyōgo (15 May 2020)
  Ashiya, Hyōgo (17 May 2020)
  Hayama, Kanagawa (1 July 2020)
  Inabe, Mie (1 July 2020)
  Kawasaki, Kanagawa (1 July 2020)
  Okayama, Okayama (1 July 2020)
  Tondabayashi, Osaka (1 July 2020)
  Kawanishi, Hyōgo (1 August 2020)
  Kaizuka, Osaka (1 September 2020)
  Kyoto, Kyoto (1 September 2020)
  Sakado, Saitama (1 October 2020)
  Koganei, Tokyo (20 October 2020)
  Kitamoto, Saitama (1 November 2020)
  Matsudo, Chiba (1 November 2020)
  Tochigi, Tochigi (1 November 2020)
  Kokubunji, Tokyo (15 November 2020)
  Kōnosu, Saitama (1 December 2020)
  Hirosaki, Aomori (10 December 2020)
  Shibukawa, Gunma (21 December 2020)
  Higashikagawa, Kagawa (1 January 2021)
  Miura, Kanagawa (1 January 2021)
  Yoshinogawa, Tokushima (1 January 2021)
  Hiroshima, Hiroshima (4 January 2021)
  Akashi, Hyōgo (8 January 2021)
  Kōchi, Kōchi (1 February 2021)
  Okegawa, Saitama (1 February 2021)
  Kameoka, Kyoto (1 March 2021)
  Ina, Saitama (1 March 2021)
  Ageo, Saitama (16 March 2021)
  Adachi, Tokyo (1 April 2021)
  Annaka, Gunma (1 April 2021)
  Chigasaki, Kanagawa (1 April 2021)
  Fuji, Shizuoka (1 April 2021)
  Fujisawa, Kanagawa (1 April 2021)
  Gyōda, Saitama (1 April 2021)
  Honjō, Saitama (1 April 2021)
  Ibusuki, Kagoshima (1 April 2021)
  Ikoma, Nara (1 April 2021) 
  Inagawa, Hyōgo (1 April 2021)
  Kitajima, Tokushima (1 April 2021)
  Koshigaya, Saitama (1 April 2021)
  Kunitachi, Tokyo (1 April 2021)
  Matsumoto, Nagano (1 April 2021)
  Miyoshi, Saitama (1 April 2021)
  Nichinan, Miyazaki (1 April 2021)
  Nishinomiya, Hyōgo (1 April 2021)
  Shōdoshima, Kagawa (1 April 2021)
  Tadotsu, Kagawa (1 April 2021)
  Tenri, Nara (1 April 2021)
  Tonoshō, Kagawa (1 April 2021)
  Toyohashi, Aichi (1 April 2021)
  Usuki, Ōita (1 April 2021)
  Yamato, Kanagawa (1 April 2021)
  Nobeoka, Miyazaki (26 April 2021)
  Urayasu, Chiba (1 May 2021)
  Chiyoda, Gunma (1 June 2021)
  Nagaokakyō, Kyoto (1 June 2021)
  Higashimatsuyama, Saitama (1 July 2021)
  Kanazawa, Ishikawa (1 July 2021)
  Minamiashigara, Kanagawa (1 July 2021)
  Ōi, Kanagawa (1 July 2021)
  Toyota, Aichi (16 July 2021)
  Miyoshi, Tokushima (1 September 2021)
  Iruma, Saitama (1 September 2021)
  Nikkō, Tochigi (1 September 2021)
  Shintomi, Miyazaki (1 September 2021)
  Ube, Yamaguchi (1 September 2021)
 Akitakata, Hiroshima (1 October 2021)
  Bizen, Okayama (1 October 2021)
  Hikone, Shiga (1 October 2021)
  Karatsu, Saga (1 October 2021)
  Kawajima, Saitama (1 October 2021)
  Kuki, Saitama (1 October 2021)
  Matsuda, Kanagawa (1 October 2021)
  Moroyama, Saitama (1 October 2021)
  Ōzu, Kumamoto (1 October 2021)
  Urasoe, Okinawa (1 October 2021)
  Mukō, Kyoto (3 October 2021)
  Sayama, Saitama (11 October 2021)
  Naka, Tokushima (1 November 2021)
  Ebino, Miyazaki (1 December 2021)
  Kōshū, Yamanashi (1 December 2021)
  Kurashiki, Okayama (1 December 2021)
  Maniwa, Okayama (1 December 2021)
  Tokigawa, Saitama (1 December 2021)
  Zentsūji, Kagawa (1 December 2021)
  Hakusan, Ishikawa (10 December 2021)
  Funabashi, Chiba (16 December 2021)
  Sōka, Saitama (20 December 2021)
  Hannō, Saitama (1 January 2022)
  Hidaka, Saitama (1 January 2022)
  Kagoshima, Kagoshima (1 January 2022)
  Mihara, Hiroshima (1 January 2022)
  Tokorozawa, Saitama (1 January 2022)
  Gamagōri, Aichi (4 January 2022)
  Ayase, Kanagawa (1 February 2022)
  Ichikawa, Chiba (1 February 2022)
 Samukawa, Kanagawa (1 February 2022)
  Tama, Tokyo (1 February 2022)
  Yoshikawa, Saitama (1 February 2022)
  Ebetsu, Hokkaido (1 March 2022)
  Kamimine, Saga (1 March 2022)
  Mima, Tokushima (1 March 2022)
  Fukaya, Saitama (23 March 2022)
  Aikawa, Kanagawa (1 April 2022)
  Akita, Akita (1 April 2022)
  Anan, Tokushima (1 April 2022) 
  Atsugi, Kanagawa (1 April 2022)
  Ayagawa, Kagawa (1 April 2022)
  Bungo-Ōno, Ōita (1 April 2022)
  Ebina, Kanagawa (1 April 2022)
  Fuchū-cho, Hiroshima (1 April 2022)
  Fujimi, Saitama (1 April 2022)
  Fukuchiyama, Kyoto (1 April 2022) 
  Fukutsu, Fukuoka (1 April 2022)
  Hakodate, Hokkaido (1 April 2022)
  Hatoyama, Saitama (1 April 2022)
  Hatsukaichi, Hiroshima (1 April 2022)
  Himeji, Hyōgo (1 April 2022)
  Hiratsuka, Kanagawa (1 April 2022) 
  Kadogawa, Miyazaki (1 April 2022)
  Kaisei, Kanagawa (1 April 2022)
  Kamikawa, Saitama (1 April 2022)
  Kamisato, Saitama (1 April 2022)
  Kan'onji, Kagawa (1 April 2022)
  Kasaoka, Okayama (1 April 2022)
  Kasuya, Fukuoka (1 April 2022)
  Kita, Tokyo (1 April 2022)
  Kitami, Hokkaido (1 April 2022)
  Komagane, Nagano (1 April 2022)
  Kosai, Shizuoka (1 April 2022)
  Kotohira, Kagawa (1 April 2022)
  Kumagaya, Saitama (1 April 2022)
  Mannō, Kagawa (1 April 2022)
  Misato-machi, Saitama (1 April 2022)
  Miyashiro, Saitama (1 April 2022)
  Musashino, Tokyo (1 April 2022)
  Nakai, Kanagawa (1 April 2022)
  Ninomiya, Kanagawa (1 April 2022)
  Nogi, Tochigi (1 April 2022)
  Ōiso, Kanagawa (1 April 2022)
  Okazaki, Aichi (1 April 2022)
  Saito, Miyazaki (1 April 2022)
  Sanuki, Kagawa (1 April 2022) 
  Seki, Gifu (1 April 2022)
  Shinshiro, Aichi (1 April 2022)
  Shizuoka, Shizuoka (1 April 2022)
  Tahara, Aichi (1 April 2022)
  Takahama, Aichi (1 April 2022)
  Taketa, Ōita (1 April 2022)
  Tatsuno, Hyōgo (1 April 2022)
  Utazu, Kagawa (1 April 2022)
  Yamakita, Kanagawa (1 April 2022)
  Yashio, Saitama (1 April 2022)
  Yokoze, Saitama (1 April 2022)
  Yoshimi, Saitama (1 April 2022)
  Yoshioka, Gunma (1 April 2022)
  Arakawa, Tokyo (25 April 2022)
  Kasugai, Aichi (1 May 2022)
  Hyūga, Miyazaki (1 June 2022)
  Narashino, Chiba (1 June 2022)
  Naruto, Tokushima (1 June 2022)
  Sakaide, Kagawa (1 June 2022)
  Tosashimizu, Kōchi (1 June 2022)
  Fujimino, Saitama (1 July 2022)
  Ibaraki, Osaka (1 July 2022)
  Kiyokawa, Kanagawa (1 July 2022)
  Sakaiminato, Tottori (1 July 2022)
  Toyokawa, Aichi (1 July 2022)
  Kikuchi, Kumamoto (30 July 2022)
  Ichinomiya, Aichi (1 September 2022)
  Miki, Kagawa (1 September 2022)
  Misato, Saitama (1 September 2022)
  Sanjō, Niigata (1 September 2022)
  Sano, Tochigi (1 September 2022)
  Toyoyama, Aichi (1 September 2022)
  Awa, Tokushima (1 October 2022)
  Echizen, Fukui (1 October 2022)
  Hashimoto, Wakayama (1 October 2022)
  Kaita, Hiroshima (1 October 2022)
  Kuroshio, Kōchi (1 October 2022)
  Miyoshi, Aichi (1 October 2022)
  Nasushiobara, Tochigi (1 October 2022)
  Ōtawara, Tochigi (1 October 2022)
  Setouchi, Okayama (1 October 2022)
  Zama, Kanagawa (1 October 2022)
  Toda, Saitama (11 October 2022)
  Ikeda, Osaka (1 November 2022)
  Nankoku, Kōchi (1 November 2022)
  Asakuchi, Okayama (1 December 2022)
  Nagano, Nagano (1 December 2022)
  Nagoya, Aichi (1 December 2022)
  Obihiro, Hokkaido (1 December 2022)
  Nonoichi, Ishikawa (4 December 2022)
  Ichinoseki, Iwate (23 December 2022)
  Hita, Ōita (1 January 2023)
  Marugame, Kagawa (1 January 2023)
  Ogano, Saitama (1 January 2023)
  Shiraoka, Saitama (1 January 2023)
  Tomakomai, Hokkaido (4 January 2023)
  Miyoshi, Hiroshima (5 January 2023)
  Wakō, Saitama (10 January 2023)
  Iwamizawa, Hokkaido (1 February 2023)
  Komaki, Aichi (1 February 2023)
  Nagaoka, Niigata (1 February 2023)
  Kikuyō, Kumamoto (1 March 2023)
  Kōnan, Kōchi (1 March 2023)
  Nisshin, Aichi (1 March 2023)
  Ranzan, Saitama (1 March 2023)
  Chōfu, Tokyo (15 March 2023)
  Kashiwa, Chiba (15 March 2023)

Future partnership systems

  Kazo, Saitama (23 March 2023)
  Asaka, Saitama (1 April 2023)
  Handa, Aichi (1 April 2023)
  Hasuda, Saitama (1 April 2023)
  Higashihiroshima, Hiroshima (1 April 2023)
  Hino, Tokyo (1 April 2023)
  Imabari, Ehime (1 April 2023)
  Kaizu, Gifu (1 April 2023)
  Kisarazu, Chiba (1 April 2023)
  Machida, Tokyo (1 April 2023)
  Nachikatsuura, Wakayama (1 April 2023)
  Niiza, Saitama (1 April 2023)
  Shiki, Saitama (1 April 2023)
  Aso, Kumamoto (April 2023)
  Bungotakada, Ōita (April 2023)
  Hokuto, Hokkaido (April 2023)
  Ikaruga, Nara (April 2023)
  Katsuyama, Fukui (April 2023)
  Kōshi, Kumamoto (April 2023)
  Maibara, Shiga (April 2022)
  Matsubushi, Saitama (April 2023)
  Nagano Prefecture (April 2023)
  Ōzu, Ehime (April 2023)
  Morioka, Iwate (May 2023)
  Isehara, Kanagawa (July 2023)
  Shimane Prefecture (1 October 2023)
  Hioki, Kagoshima (October 2023)
  Asahikawa, Hokkaido (2023)
  Awara, Fukui (2023)
  Kimitsu, Chiba (2023)
  Muroran, Hokkaido (2023)
  Ōmihachiman, Shiga (2023)
  Ōmura, Nagasaki (2023)
  Sakata, Yamagata (2023)
  Tomioka, Fukushima (2023)
  Otaru, Hokkaido (1 January 2024)
  Eiheiji, Fukui (April 2024)
  Hida, Gifu (TBD, supposed to have been introduced in 2019)

Measures to allow partnership certificates have been proposed in numerous areas, including the prefectures of Gifu, Ishikawa, Iwate, Tokushima, and Wakayama; several administrative wards in Tokyo, such as Chiyoda, Chūō, Katsushika, Kōtō, Nerima, Shinjuku, Suginami, Sumida, and Taitō; and the cities of Seto, Hachinohe, Kashiwa, Matsuyama, Tagawa, Fuchū, Fukuyama, Kumano, Onomichi, Saka, Sera, Fukagawa, Kushiro, Takikawa, Kakogawa, Kobe, Miki, Tamba, Tamba-Sasayama, Rikuzentakata, Sendai, Azumino, Nagayo, Sado, Hayashima, Kumenan, Tamano, Itoman, Okinawa, Nago, Nanjō, Tomigusuku, Hanyū, Kasukabe, Sugito, Tsurugashima, Warabi, Fujieda, Shimada, Higashimurayama, Komatsushima, Daisen,  Nichinan, Yazu, Yonago, Toyama, Hagi, Hirao, Iwakuni, and  Shimonoseki.

Statistics
The first couple to receive a partnership certificate were Koyuki Higashi and Hiroko Masuhara in Shibuya on 5 November 2015. They were personally congratulated by Mayor Ken Hasebe. Later that day, Setagaya issued certificates to seven couples. By April 2017, 17 same-sex partnership certificates had been issued in Shibuya.

319 certificates had been issued by November 2018. This increased to 617 in October 2019, to 1,052 in June 2020, to 1,301 in November 2020, to 2,018 in July 2021, and to 3,168 in June 2022, with most of these issued in Osaka Prefecture followed by Tokyo, Kanagawa and Chiba prefectures.

Private-sector partnerships
As a private sector response to the lack of national recognition of same-sex partnerships, the Famiee Project created a digital blockchain-secured partnership registry in 2019. In order to receive a Famiee certificate, the couple must apply via a mobile app and will receive a digital certificate to be used as proof of familial status. The Famiee Project received the backing of at least 17 companies who will recognize the digital partnership certificate and treat a couple the same as a different-sex couple for banking and insurance purposes. The partnerships are not currently recognized by the Government of Japan, but aim to create pressure from the private sector for political action to expand LGBT rights in the country.

Same-sex marriage

Same-sex marriage (同性結婚) is not recognized in Japan. However, debate on the issue has emerged in recent years, with several political parties expressing support or openness to discuss the matter. Several lawsuits contesting the law barring same-sex marriage were filed in court in February 2019. In addition, numerous opinion surveys have shown high levels of support for same-sex marriage among the Japanese public, notably among women and the younger generation.

Background
On March 27, 2009, it was reported that Japan allows its nationals to marry same-sex foreign partners in countries where same-sex marriage is legal. Japan does not allow same-sex marriage domestically and had so far also refused to issue a document, which states that a person is single and of legal age and is required for citizens to wed overseas, if the applicant's intended spouse was of the same legal sex. Under the change, the Ministry of Justice instructed local authorities to issue the key certificate for those who want to have same-sex marriages.

In June 2011, the deputy head abbot of Kyoto's Shunkō-in Zen temple announced that the temple would perform same-sex marriage ceremonies as part of Gay and Lesbian Pride Month. Similarly, in April 2020, the deputy head abbot of Kawagoe's Saimyouji temple, announced that he would perform same-sex marriage ceremonies. Since 15 May 2012, Tokyo Disney Resort has allowed symbolic (not legally recognized) same-sex marriage ceremonies in its Cinderella's Castle hotel. Its first same-sex marriage was held on March 3, 2013, between Koyuki Higashi and her partner Hiroko Masuhara.

In March 2019, the Justice Ministry revoked a deportation order for a gay Taiwanese man who had remained in Japan illegally after overstaying his visa, giving consideration to his longtime same-sex relationship with a Japanese national. The ministry issued a special residence permit to the man, who had lived in Japan for about 25 years. The ministry's Immigration Bureau granted him a one-year resident visa after the Tokyo District Court suggested that it review the order.

Constitution
Article 24 of the Japanese Constitution states: "Marriage shall be based only on the mutual consent of both sexes and it shall be maintained through mutual cooperation with the equal rights of husband and wife as a basis." Previously, a couple in Japan could marry only if their respective head of household (the father, or in the absence of a father, the eldest son) consented to the union. As a result, arranged marriage was the dominant form of marriage. Those couples who could not obtain permission had to elope and stay in common-law marriage. The purpose of Article 24 of the Constitution was to assert freedom of consenting adults to marry, and to explicitly establish the equality of both sexes in marriage. Some legal scholars argue that because the intent behind the article was not in reference to same-sex marriage, it need not apply in legalising same-sex marriage. However, conservative lawmakers as well as legal scholars who take a literal approach to constitutional interpretation argue that such an argument is a stretch.

In February 2015, the National Diet debated whether same-sex marriage should be recognized under the Constitution. Kota Matsuda, a member of the House of Councillors, said, "We need to eliminate lifestyle difficulties for same-sex couples. A prerequisite to achieving this goal is dealing with Article 24 of the Constitution." Prime Minister Shinzō Abe expressed his opinion on the issue: "Extending the institution of marriage to same-sex couples was not anticipated under the current Constitution. It is an issue that concerns the very core of family values and, I believe, one that requires extremely careful consideration."

In July 2019, the Japan Federation of Bar Associations submitted a paper in support of same-sex marriage to the Minister of Justice, the Prime Minister, the Speaker of the House of Representatives and the President of the House of Councillors. The paper states that Article 24 does not ban such marriages as "the notion of same-sex marriage was beyond the scope of assumption at the time of [Article 24's] enactment", and that prohibiting it constitutes a breach of human rights, urging the National Diet to legalize same-sex marriage.

Political support and legislation
The Constitutional Democratic Party of Japan (CDP), the Japanese Communist Party (JCP), the Social Democratic Party (SDP) and Reiwa Shinsengumi, as well as the junior coalition partner Komeito support same-sex marriage. The conservative Nippon Ishin no Kai also supports same-sex marriage, but believes a constitutional amendment is necessary to legalize it. Individual lawmakers from the Liberal Democratic Party, including the former Minister of Defense and for Foreign Affairs, Taro Kono, and the former Minister of Agriculture, Ken Saitō, and from the Democratic Party for the People (including party leader Yuichiro Tamaki), have also expressed their personal support for same-sex marriage.

In December 2018, the CDP announced it would introduce a bill in 2019 to amend the Civil Code to legalise same-sex marriage. The bill was submitted by the CDP, the JCP and the SDP on 3 June 2019. It seeks to adopt gender-neutral language, with the terms "party of marriage" being used rather than "husband" and "wife", and "parents" rather than "father and mother". In June 2019, the CDP added the legalisation of same-sex marriage and ending discrimination against the LGBT community to their party platform ahead of the 2019 House of Councillors election. Another same-sex marriage bill was introduced to Parliament by the CDP in March 2023.

In September 2020, the Nagaokakyō City Assembly adopted a motion urging the National Diet to discuss the legalization of same-sex marriage.

Supporters of same-sex marriage hope the introduction of the partnership oath system in numerous municipalities will encourage parliamentarians to legalise same-sex marriage. The LGBT organisation Marriage for All Japan has also organised signature gatherings and meetings with lawmakers from across the political spectrum. The organisation notes in particular that the COVID-19 pandemic has made same-sex couples more "vulnerable" and "anxious", as they cannot visit each other in hospitals nor are they entitled to any legal recognition if one of the partners were to die.

In January 2023, Prime Minister Fumio Kishida made the following statement about same-sex marriage during a parliamentary session: "We need to be extremely careful in considering the matter as it could affect the structure of family life in Japan". Kishida said in March 2023 that he did not think banning same-sex couples from marrying is "unjust discrimination".

Legal challenges

2020 Tokyo High Court ruling
On 4 March 2020, the Tokyo High Court ruled that cohabiting same-sex couples should be entitled to the same legal benefits as those granted to cohabiting heterosexual couples. This ruling provided legitimacy to the plaintiff's same-sex relationship, allowing the plaintiff to sue her lesbian partner of seven years for infidelity, a move that was previously restricted to heterosexual partners. The decision was upheld by the Supreme Court of Japan on 18 March 2021.

Sapporo, Osaka, and Tokyo district court rulings
In November 2018, several same-sex couples throughout the country announced their intention to file suit against the statutory same-sex marriage ban. In January 2019, about a dozen same-sex couples applied for marriage licenses at different city offices in Japan. Lawsuits contesting the same-sex marriage ban were filed by 13 couples on 14 February (Valentine's Day) in district courts in Tokyo, Osaka, Nagoya and Sapporo. Another three couples filed in Fukuoka a few months later.

On 17 March 2021, the district court in Sapporo issued a judgment finding that the law banning same-sex marriage violated the constitutional rights of same-sex couples, specifically Article 14 of the Constitution of Japan (which bans discrimination on the basis of "race, creed, sex, social status or family origin"). However, the court rejected the request of the six plaintiffs (two male couples and one female couple) for ¥1,000,000 (equivalent to about $9,000 or £6,480) per person for the denial. The court rejected the government's argument that Article 24 of the Constitution (which defines marriage as based on the "mutual consent of both sexes") limits marriage to opposite-sex couples; plaintiffs argued that this article actually only bars forced marriage. The Chief Cabinet Secretary, Katsunobu Katō, said at a press conference later that day that the Ministry of Justice would analyse the court ruling.

Similar arguments were raised in the Tokyo District Court case, in which hearings and oral arguments took place on several dates in 2019 and 2020. One of the plaintiff couples, Chizuka Oe and Yoko Ogawa, a couple for 25 years, argued that banning same-sex marriage violates articles 13 and 14 of the Constitution. Lawyers representing the couples believed the ruling from the Sapporo District Court was likely to have a positive impact on the outcome of the other cases. However, in June 2022, the Osaka District Court ruled that the ban on same-sex marriage is constitutional, and in November 2022, the Tokyo District Court ruled similarly. The Tokyo court did rule, however, that there should be some way for same-sex couples to protect themselves legally. The plaintiff couples in the Tokyo case appealed  the decision on December 13.

The Nagoya and Fukuoka courts are expected to rule in May and June 2023, respectively.

Koseki
In Japan, each citizen is registered through the koseki system whereby an individual is registered as a part of a household (while in the West, a birth certificate can act as a proof of identity). Koseki registration performs a somewhat similar role to marriage in the West as it endows a member of the same koseki legal power (as next of kin) in dealing with civil matters such as inheritance, hospital visits or the right to organise a funeral. Therefore, registering each other as a part of the koseki works as a substitute for Western-style marriage. As a consequence, Japanese same-sex couples, in the absence of same-sex marriage or civil partnership laws, often use adoption procedures to register themselves as belonging to the same household (where the older partner legally adopts the younger partner, which in absence of a spouse makes the only adopted child the sole executor of that household).

Public opinion
A May 2013 Ipsos poll found that out of over a thousand Japanese adult interviewees 24% were in favor of same-sex marriage and another 27% supported other forms of recognition for same-sex couples. An April 2014 Ipsos poll found that 26% of respondents were in favor of same-sex marriage and 24% were in favor of some other form of recognition, such as civil unions. A May 2015 Ipsos poll found that 30% of respondents were in favour of same-sex marriage and a further 28% were in favour of some other form of recognition (meaning that 58% supported recognising same-sex couples in some form).

According to a survey by Nihon Yoron Chōsa-ka conducted on 1 and 2 March 2014, 42.3% of Japanese people supported same-sex marriage, while 52.4% opposed it. Another poll conducted by Fuji News Network in April 2015 showed that 59% of respondents supported the same-sex partnership certificate system proposed in Shibuya and 53% supported same-sex marriage, the first time a poll had found majority support for same-sex marriage in Japan. An additional poll conducted by the National Institute of Population and Social Security Research in November 2015 showed a 51% majority in support of same-sex marriage, unions or partnerships, while 41% were opposed. People under the age of 20 were overwhelmingly in favor of same-sex marriage (72% support), whereas people aged 70 and over overwhelmingly opposed (24% support). A 2017 opinion poll released by the NHK showed that 51% of Japanese people supported same-sex marriage.

According to an opinion poll carried out by Dentsu in October 2018, 78.4% of Japanese people in their 20s to 50s were in favour of same-sex marriage. Support was higher among women (87.9%) than men (69.2%), and was higher among younger respondents: 87.3% for people in their 20s, 81.2% for people in their 30s, 77.5% for people in their 40s, and 72.5% for people in their 50s. The National Survey of Household Trends, a government survey carried out in 2018 and commissioned by the National Institute of Population and Social Security Research, asked Japanese married women about their views on legalizing same-sex marriage. 71.9% of respondents chose one of the two answers in favour of it. Levels of support were different between the different age groups: 92.1% for married women under the age of 30, 89.5% for those between the ages of 30 and 39, 83.2% for those between the ages of 40 and 49, 73.5% for those between 50 and 59, 59.3% for those between 60 and 69, and 42.2% for those aged 70 and higher.

A 2019 opinion survey conducted by the Hiroshima Shudo University and published in November 2020 showed that 64.8% of Japanese people supported same-sex marriage, while 30.0% were opposed. Attitudes varied greatly with age, with 81% of 20–30-year-olds supporting, followed by 74% of people in their 40s and 50s, and 47% of people in their 60s and 70s.

A joint survey by the University of Tokyo and The Asahi Shimbun, conducted between March and April 2020, showed that 46% of Japanese people favored same-sex marriage, 31% were neutral and 23% were opposed. Among supporters of the Liberal Democratic Party (LDP), support stood at 41% and opposition at 29%. This contrasted significantly with the opinions of LDP lawmakers, as a 2019 survey conducted shortly before the House of Councillors election showed that only 9% of LDP candidates supported same-sex marriage. Professor Masaki Taniguchi, who headed the survey, said it was rare to witness public opinion on a certain issue change so rapidly, noting that support had increased 14% from 2017. A March 2021 poll from The Asahi Shimbun found that 65% of Japanese people supported same-sex marriage, with support rising to 86% among 18–29-year-olds. A February 2023 Kyodo News poll showed that 64% of Japanese people supported same-sex marriage, while 25% were opposed. A poll conducted the same month by The Asahi Shimbun found that 72% of Japanese people supported same-sex marriage and 18% were opposed.

See also
 Homosexuality in Japan
 Marriage in Japan
 LGBT rights in Japan
 LGBT rights in Tokyo
 Recognition of same-sex unions in Asia
 Same-sex union court cases

Notes

References

Japanese family law
LGBT rights in Japan
Marriage, unions and partnerships in Japan
Politics of Japan
Japan